Cerithium lividulum is a species of sea snail, a marine gastropod mollusk in the family Cerithiidae.

Description

Distribution
This species occurs in the Mediterranean Sea.

References

 Deshayes G. P. (1835-1845). [in] Lamarck, Histoire naturelle des animaux sans vertèbres. 2ed. par G. P. Deshayes e H. Milne-Edwards.
 Monterosato T.A. (1917). Molluschi viventi e quaternari raccolti lungo le coste della Tripolitania dall'ing. Camillo Crema. Bollettino della Società Zoologica Italiana. ser. 3, 4: 1-28, pl. 1.
 Monterosato T.A. di. (1923). Molluschi delle coste Cirenaiche raccolti dall'Ing. Crema. Memorie del Regio Comitato Talassografico Italiano. 106: 1-14.
 Arnaud, P. M., 1978. - Révision des taxa malacologiques méditerrannéens introduits par Antoine Risso. Annales du Muséum d'Histoire Naturelle de Nice "1977"5: 101-150
 Gofas, S.; Le Renard, J.; Bouchet, P. (2001). Mollusca. in: Costello, M.J. et al. (eds), European Register of Marine Species: a check-list of the marine species in Europe and a bibliography of guides to their identification. Patrimoines Naturels. 50: 180-213

External links
 Risso, A., 1826 Histoire naturelle des principales productions de l'Europe Méridionale et particulièrement de celles des environs de Nice et des Alpes-Maritimes. Mollusques, vol. 4, p. 1-439, 12 pls
 Anton, H. E. (1838). Verzeichniss der Conchylien welche sich in der Sammlung von Herrmann Eduard Anton befinden. Herausgegeben von dem Besitzer. Halle: Anton. xvi + 110 pp
 Locard A. (1886). Prodrome de malacologie française. Catalogue général des mollusques vivants de France. Mollusque marins. Lyon, H. Georg & Paris, Baillière : pp. X + 778
 Locard A. & Caziot E. (1900-1901). Les coquilles marines des côtes de Corse. Annales de la Société Linnéenne de Lyon, 46: 193-274 [1900; 47: 1-80, 159-291]
 Pallary P. (1900). Coquilles marines du littoral du départment d'Oran. Journal de Conchyliologie. 48(3): 211-422
 Pallary P. (1920). Exploration scientifique du Maroc organisée par la Société de Géographie de Paris et continuée par la Société des Sciences Naturelles du Maroc. Deuxième fascicule. Malacologie (1912). Larose, Rabat et Paris pp. 108, 1 pl., 1 map
 Bucquoy E., Dautzenberg P. & Dollfus G. (1882-1886). Les mollusques marins du Roussillon. Tome Ier. Gastropodes. Paris: Baillière & fils. 570 pp., 66 pls. [pp. 1-84, pls 1-10, 1882; pp. 85-196, pls 11-20, 1883; pp. 197-342, pls 21-40, 1884; pp. 343-418, pls 41-50, 1885; pp. 419-570, pls 51-66, 1886
 Pallary P. (1938). Les Mollusques marins de la Syrie. Journal de Conchyliologie. 82(1): 5-58, pls 1-2
 allary P. (1919). Enumération des mollusques marins des côtes de la Syrie. Bulletin de la Société d'Histoire Naturelle d'Afrique du Nord. 10 (7): 166-172; 10 (8): 175-176

Cerithiidae
Gastropods described in 1826